Ronny Nouwen (born 21 July 1982, in Rotterdam) is a dutch football midfielder who currently plays for SV Charlerois.

Club career
Nouwen played professional football with Excelsior Rotterdam before joining the amateur ranks with DOTO in 2005. In summer 2009 he joined RVVH from Ridderkerk. In 2010, he moved on to SC Feyenoord, in 2010 to IFC Ambacht, and in 2018 to SV Charlerois. He retired from playing in 2020.

International career
Nouwen made his debut for Aruba in a March 2004 World Cup qualification match against Surinam. He has played five games for Aruba.

References

External links

1982 births
Living people
Dutch people of Aruban descent
Aruban footballers
Aruba international footballers
Association football midfielders
Excelsior Rotterdam players
Eredivisie players
Eerste Divisie players
Footballers from Rotterdam
SC Feyenoord players
Ido's Football Club players